Ali Kanaan (born 12 December 1985 in Beirut, Lebanon) is a Lebanese Canadian basketball player currently playing for Byblos and the Lebanon national basketball team.

Early life and education 
Born to Anis Kanaan and Amira El-Fares of Beirut, Lebanon, Kanaan immigrated to Canada. He played in Vanier College (Ville Saint Laurent, Quebec) and College Montmorency (Laval, Quebec). He played in the NCAA for 4 years with the University of Massachusetts Lowell.

Career

Early career (Highschool and College)

He played four years at Georges-Vanier high school in the Province of Quebec, Canada.

Ali played for the University of Massachusetts Lowell. for four years, a Division II school who is in the Northeast 10 conference. He played his freshman year for them during the 06-07 season where he averaged 3.8 points and 4.0 rebounds a game during his freshman season.

Pro career

In 2010 after the 2010 FIBA World Championship and after graduating from college Ali became pro and he signed with Lebanese Riyadi in the Lebanese Basketball League due to A list Ali was loaned to Antranik SC in exchange of Charbel El Sokn.

National team

Kanaan became a member of the Lebanon national basketball team, with whom he debuted with at the FIBA Asia Championship 2009. At the tournament, he averaged 2.2 points and 3.2 rebounds for the fourth-placed Lebanese team.

References

External links
Ali Kanan page on UMass River Hawks site

1985 births
Living people
Lebanese men's basketball players
University of Massachusetts Lowell alumni
Lebanese emigrants to Canada
Power forwards (basketball)
2010 FIBA World Championship players
Al Riyadi Club Beirut basketball players
Sportspeople of Lebanese descent
UMass Lowell River Hawks men's basketball players